Alcsútdoboz is a village in Fejér county, Hungary. Alcsútdoboz was created in 1950 by the merger of the municipalities of Alcsút (German: Altschutt) and Vértesdoboz.

History 
Archduke Joseph, Palatine of Hungary had his country estate Alcsút Palace there. It was constructed by the renowned architect Mihály Pollack. It was destroyed during World War II, with only the portico remaining.

Archduke Joseph August of Austria, who was for a short period head of state of Hungary, was born in Alcsút.

Hungarian Prime Minister Viktor Orbán was raised in Alcsútdoboz.

References

External links

Aerial photographs of Alcsútdoboz

Populated places in Fejér County